Lana Popham is Canadian politician representing the riding of Saanich South in the Legislature of British Columbia who has been the Minister of Tourism, Arts, Culture and Sport since 2022. She was first elected in 2009 provincial general election to the 39th Parliament and then re-elected in 2013, 2017 and 2020 to the 40th, 41st and 42nd Parliaments.

As a member of the British Columbia New Democratic Party, she was part of the official opposition to the governing BC Liberal Party until 2017 when the NDP formed the government and she became the Minister of Agriculture. As minister, she led the adoption of two bills, both of which amended the Agricultural Land Commission Act (Bills 15 and 52), and an order in council that began the phasing out of mink farming.

While in opposition, she served predominately as the critic on agricultural issues and introduced two private members bills: the British Columbia Local Food Act and the Prevention of Cruelty to Animals (Mink Farms) Amendment Act. Prior to her election, Popham owned and operated the organic grape orchard, Barking Dog Vineyard, on Vancouver Island.

Background
Though born in Regina, Saskatchewan, Lana Popham was raised on Quadra Island, one of the Discovery Islands off the central-east coast of Vancouver Island. She graduated from the University of British Columbia with a bachelor of arts in geography and a major in urban planning. She married an Oak Bay firefighter and together they had a son. In 1997, they developed Barking Dog Vineyard, which, in 2000, became the first certified organic vineyard on Vancouver Island.

She has participated in numerous organizations, including the Island Organic Producers Association, the Peninsula Agricultural Commission. In 2005, she served as president of the Wine Islands Growers Association. She has been a member of several District of Saanich committees, including planning, transportation, and economic development committees. In 2007 she engaged in the "100 km Less" campaign challenging people to eliminate 100 kilometres from their weekly driving. In 2008 she campaigned to reduce or ban plastic shopping bags in the Capital Regional District, in favour of reusable bags.

Popham was a candidate in the 2005 Saanich municipal elections, but did not win a seat on council. She began campaigning for the 2008 municipal elections but withdrew to run for the provincial NDP nomination in the Saanich South riding. The MLA, New Democrat David Cubberley, had announced he would not run in the next election and party rules required that his successor be female. Being unopposed, Popham was acclaimed the NDP candidate in Saanich South for the 2009 provincial general election. The Saanich South election was expected to be one of the closest in the province with Popham facing former CHEK-TV reporter and news anchor and BC Liberal candidate Robin Adair, lawyer and Western Canada Concept Party leader Doug Christie, and Green Party candidate Brian Gordon. Popham was one of four candidates in the province endorsed by the Conservation Voters of BC. Popham won the May 12 election by 482 votes and her party formed the official opposition.

39th Parliament
In the 39th Parliament she served as a member on the Select Standing Committee on Public Accounts and was the NDP agriculture and lands critic. To understand provincial agricultural issues better, in the summer 2009, Popham and Cariboo North MLA Bob Simpson toured the BC Interior where they met with agricultural organizations and local producers. She joined with fellow NDP MLAs Scott Fraser and Claire Trevena, in conjunction with the Western Canada Wilderness Committee, in lobbying for the stop to old-growth logging on Vancouver Island and the Lower Mainland.

In August 2011, while Popham was out of town, her constituency office experienced a roof fire. In November 2010, Popham became one of 13 NDP caucus members to call for a leadership review of Carole James. Under James' successor, Adrian Dix, Popham remained agriculture critic and they advocated for health authorities to use local food in hospitals, reinstating the Buy B.C. program, easing the regulations that restrict meat processing sales,  and lobbied the Province of Ontario for compatible labeling laws in support of a proposed federal law that would allow inter-provincial sales of wine.

Popham was featured in the 2011 Canadian documentary film Peace Out where she spoke about the food supply ramifications of flooding the Peace River Valley for the controversial Site C dam proposal.

Popham's public position on agricultural issues include reinstating the Buy B.C. program, making it more difficult to remove land from the Agricultural Land reserve and reinstating agricultural extension officers. Popham opposes the commercial production of the genetically engineered Arctic Apple, arguing it could negatively affect the reputation of BC fruit. She is a leading proponent of increased protection for native pollinators and honey bees on Vancouver Island, maintaining a blog on the subject.

Popham delivered an overview of the BCNDP's agriculture plan on March 4 and 5, 2013 to the BC Legislature.

40th Parliament
She ran for re-election in the provincial election May 14, 2013 and was re-elected. However, Popham's party lost the general election and again formed the official opposition. Party leader Adrian Dix appointed Popham to a critic role focusing on small business, tourism, arts and culture. With resignation of Dix as leader and the subsequent leadership election, Popham again endorsed Mike Farnworth. However, Farnworth withdrew his nomination and John Horgan went on to become leader. Horgan reassigned Popham back to critic on agriculture and food, though he would later add critic role for small business back to her duties. During the 40th Parliament of British Columbia, Popham introduced two private member bills, neither of which advanced beyond first reading. In May 2015 during the fourth session, and again in May 2016 during the fifth session, she introduced the British Columbia Local Food Act (Bill M-222) which would have established a Food and Agricultural Committee in the legislative assembly, require the committee to establish a Local Food Strategy, and make recommendation for appointments to the Agricultural Land Commission, move the Zone 2 areas of the Agricultural Land Reserve into Zone 1, and re-establish the Ministry of Agriculture's Buy BC marketing program. In May 2016, Popham also introduce the Prevention of Cruelty to Animals (Mink Farms) Amendment Act (Bill M-237) which would have implemented the National Farm Animal Care Council's code of practice for farmed mink.

41st Parliament
In the 2017 election, she was challenged by Olympic rower Dave Calder on behalf of the BC Liberal Party, her son's former teacher Mark Neufeld for the Green Party, Andrew McLean for the Libertarian Party, and Richard Pattee for the newly-created Vancouver Island Party. Though Popham won the riding, her party again formed the official opposition as the 41st Parliament began. After the governing BC Liberal Party lost a confidence vote and the BC NDP formed the government, Popham was appointed to be Minister of Agriculture in Premier John Horgan's Executive Council. In this role, Popham oversaw the implementation of BC NDP's agricultural platform of reforming the Agricultural Land Commission and developing the Grow BC, Feed BC and Buy BC initiatives. She introduced the Agricultural Land Commission Amendment Act, 2018 (Bill 52) and the Agricultural Land Commission Amendment Act, 2019 (Bill 15) which, among other items, undid the previous parliament's division of the Agricultural Land Reserve into two zones with different regulations and reduced the amount of housing permitted on agricultural land.

42nd Parliament
Popham was re-elected in the 2020 election. Her NDP formed a majority government in the ensuing 42nd Parliament and Premier Horgan kept Popham in the Executive Council but re-named her role to Minister of Agriculture, Food and Fisheries. In that role she issued an Order in Council to allow for new housing to be constructed on lands within the Agricultural Land Reserve and to phase-out mink farming.

Electoral history

References

External links
 Inside Saanich South - Lana Popham's blog
  Legislative Assembly of British Columbia - Lana Popham
 BC New Democratic Party - Lana Popham
 The Land Conservancy of British Columbia - Barking Dog Organic Vineyard (Conservation Partner)
 Healthy Island Bees  - Lana Popham

1968 births
British Columbia New Democratic Party MLAs
Women government ministers of Canada
Living people
Members of the Executive Council of British Columbia
People from the Capital Regional District
Politicians from Regina, Saskatchewan
Women MLAs in British Columbia
University of British Columbia alumni
21st-century Canadian politicians
21st-century Canadian women politicians
Canadian farmers
Canadian winemakers